Sheykh Taleb (also Romanized as Sheykh Ţāleb; also known as Ţāleb) is a village in Seyyed Abbas Rural District, Shavur District, Shush County, Khuzestan Province, Iran. At the 2006 census, its population was 41, in 8 families.

References 

Populated places in Shush County